Kelli Hill (born 1960 in Silver Spring, Maryland) is a United States Artistic gymnastics coach who coached Olympians Dominique Dawes, Elise Ray, and Courtney Kupets, and Olympic reserves Corrie Lothrop and Kayla DiCello. She was the head coach of the 2000 and 2004 Olympic teams and of the 1994, 1996, 1999, and 2003 World Championship teams for Women's artistic gymnastics. She is the owner of Hill's Gymnastics Training Center (Hill's Angels) in Gaithersburg, Maryland

Biography

Hill was born in Silver Spring, Maryland and attended Montgomery Blair High School. She did gymnastics as a child and a teen, however she has described herself as a "low level" gymnast who was "not good at it."

She went to the University of Maryland where she walked on to the gymnastics team. She intended to major in physical education, with the goal of coaching gymnastics. However, she dropped out months before graduation due to the requirement that she spend eight weeks as a student-teacher.

In 1981, at age 21, she bought a gym in Wheaton, Maryland. She moved the gym to Gaithersburg, Maryland in 1991.

Coaching

After opening her gym in 1991, Kelli's mother ran the gym's office for her while she coached. Because she had no formal training in coaching gymnastics, she learned how to coach by "trial and error".

She coached Dominique Dawes to three consecutive Olympic games; Barcelona in 1992, Atlanta in 1996, and Sydney in 2000. In 2000 both Dominique Dawes and teammate Elise Ray competed and won a team bronze medal*. In 2004, Hill's gymnast Courtney Kupets scored highest in the Olympic trials, and traveled to Athens where she won bronze on uneven bars and contributed scores on bars and floor to the team's 2nd-place finish. Hill's gymnast Corrie Lothrop was an alternate on the 2008 Olympic team, but did not compete.

Originally, China won the bronze medal for the team all-around competition. In 2010, the Chinese gymnasts were stripped of their medals following an investigation which revealed that the Chinese team had falsified documents to allow the underage Dong Fangxiao to compete.

Dominique Dawes

Kelli Hill was Dominique's only coach for the duration of her gymnastics career. At age 6, she joined Hill's Angels a year after it was founded. Recognizing her natural abilities immediately, Kelli encouraged her to come to the gym as often as possible. By age 10, Dominique was competing as an elite gymnast.  When the gym moved to its new location in 1991, Dominique moved into Kelli's home in order to be closer to the gym. Dominique later attended The University of Maryland and continued to see her old coach on a regular basis. Both have described their relationship as close, and Dominique consistently praises the way Hill trained her. I wouldn't be where I am without her support and guidance," Dawes said of Hill. "I didn't get here on my own. In my 18 years in the sport, she did a very good job protecting me from everything that was going on outside of gymnastics. She made me focus on the things I had control of and everything else was just put aside in a stack -- everything from how the judges felt about me to the temperature of the gym. She was very big on instilling that lesson" 

At the 1993 World Championships, Dominique was in first place in the all around competition, but slipped on her final vault, bursting into tears. A famous moment in gymnastics, Kelli encouraged her to be proud of her performance, telling her: "It's okay, you gave it a good shot. When did you ever think you would be in that position? You have to be happy with yourself. Come on. Be happy. Stand up and wave." Dominique was given a standing ovation from the crowd for doing so.

Notable Achievements

Hill coached a National team member every year from 1989 to 2011, except for in 2006. She had at least one gymnast on every Olympic team, or as an alternate, from 1992 to 2008.

She was named as the USA Gymnastics coach of the year in 1991, 1993, 2000 and 2003, and the U.S. Elite Coaches Association coach of the year in 1991, 1993, 1996, 2000 and 2003. She was inducted into the gymnastics hall of fame in 2005.

Personal life

Hill has two children, Ryan, 30, and Jason, 28, and lives in Gaithersburg, Maryland. She enjoys cooking and baking, gardening, and doing needlepoint.

References

External links 
Hill's Gymnastics
Gymnastike Profile

Living people
1960 births
American female artistic gymnasts
People from Silver Spring, Maryland
People from Wheaton, Maryland
People from Gaithersburg, Maryland
21st-century American women